Phyllodactylus magnus is a species of gecko. It is native to Mexico and Guatemala.

References

Phyllodactylus
Reptiles of Mexico
Reptiles of Guatemala
Reptiles described in 1942
Taxa named by Edward Harrison Taylor